Compsaditha is a genus of pseudoscorpions in the family Tridenchthoniidae. There are about 12 described species in Compsaditha.

Species
These 12 species belong to the genus Compsaditha:

References

Further reading

External links

 

Tridenchthoniidae
Pseudoscorpion genera